Phacellaria is a genus of flowering plants belonging to the family Santalaceae.

Its native range is Assam to Southern China and Peninsula Malaysia.

Species
Species:

Phacellaria caulescens 
Phacellaria compressa 
Phacellaria fargesii 
Phacellaria malayana 
Phacellaria rigidula 
Phacellaria tonkinensis

References

Santalaceae
Santalales genera